Jabadá is a village in the Oio Region of western-central Guinea-Bissau. It lies on the southern bank of the Geba River.

References

Populated places in Guinea-Bissau
Oio Region